Wynne Alexander is an American author, investigative journalist, and documentary filmmaker.

She is the author of the civil rights history book, Get It From The Drums, which became the first musically-infused Civil Rights curriculum in the United States. The book also includes a 15-song CD produced by Alexander to accompany the text, and features interviews with and music by Buffy Sainte-Marie, Pete Seeger, Janis Ian, Judy Collins, and Kenny Gamble. Other leading artists featured on the CD are Marvin Gaye, James Brown, Nina Simone, Buffalo Springfield, Curtis Mayfield and Creedence Clearwater Revival, Edwin Starr, Country Joe and the Fish, The Chambers Brothers, Barry McGuire, Phil Ochs, The O’Jays and Harold Melvin and the BlueNotes. The book's historical narrative also included in-depth interviews with Mrs. Thurgood Marshall and Adam Clayton Powell, III. She also wrote Jazz in the City: The Legends of Philadelphia’s Jazz Machine, chronicling Philadelphia’s contributions to jazz history along with producing a 10-song CD which accompanies the text.

Her career in broadcasting began in her late teens as an anchor and political reporter at WDAS AM-FM Radio in Philadelphia, Pennsylvania. United States Senator Robert P. Casey Jr. called her "a leading voice for social justice" and the Pennsylvania legislature commended her "life's work at the intersection of music, civil rights and journalism." Noted for her investigative journalism and civil rights advocacy, Alexander has interviewed Coretta Scott King, Muhammad Ali, Rosa Parks, Buffy Sainte-Marie, Ambassador Andrew Young, Chilean President Michelle Bachelet, and Egypt's Madame Jehan Sadat.

As a founding member of Latino Lines, she was involved in the Latino voting rights and redistricting battle in Pennsylvania from 2011 to 2013. Alexander writes and curates the civil rights history website WDASHistory.org.

Awards and honors
 Coat-of-Arms Award from the Black Marines of New Jersey
 City Council Award – Filmmaking Resolution
 Church of the Advocate Excellence in Filmmaking – Caring for Children Award

Filmography

Mini-Documentary films written and directed by Alexander:

 Inspiration form the Nation Toughest Streets: The Lighthouse
 Rescuing Quality Education for All
 Turning Points for Children
 Latino Civil Rights and Empowerment

References

External links
 WynneAlexanderMedia.com Official site
 WDASHistory.org

21st-century American non-fiction writers
Living people
Year of birth missing (living people)